Mike Walker is a radio dramatist and feature and documentary writer. His radio work includes both original plays and adaptations of novels, classical and modern. He has won Sony Radio Awards for his play Alpha (2001) and for his script for Different States (1991), and a Silver Community Award for Oxford Road on BBC Radio Berkshire, as well the British Writers' Guild award for best dramatisation for his 1996 adaptation of The Tin Drum by Günter Grass. He was also part of the writing team for BBC Radio 4's The Dark House, which won a BAFTA Interactive Award.

He won the 2012 Bronze Sony Radio Academy Award for Best Drama with A Tale of Two Cities.

Works 
His plays include:
for BBC World Service – Alpha, Omega, Tide Race 
for BBC Radio 3 – Babel's Tower, Darger and the Detective
for BBC Radio 4 – D Day Project, The Dark House, Uncertainty, The Patrick Nicholls Story, Buried By Glass, Three Divided By Two, Silvertown, The Making of Napoleon, Act or Die, The Sound of Fury, Orphans, Something Happened, Texas and the Poppy Fields, Different States, Caesar! (three series of plays about the rulers of Rome [2003–2007]), Plantagenet (three series of plays about the Plantagenet kings of England [2010–2012]), Spitfire!, Tsar (three series of plays about the rulers of Russia from Ivan IV to Vladimir Putin), The Gun Goes to Hollywood, Landfall and The Stuarts (a series of plays about The House of Stuart, from Mary, Queen of Scots to Charlotte Stuart [2013-2015]).

His adaptations include:
 War and Peace (BBC Radio 4 Classic Serial, 1997)
 Nicholas Nickleby (BBC Radio 4, 1999)
 The Tin Drum (BBC Radio 4 Classic Serial, 2000)
 Crime and Punishment (BBC Radio 4 Classic Serial, 2000)
 The African Queen (BBC Radio 4, 2001)
 Neuromancer (BBC World Service Drama, 2002)
 The Old Curiosity Shop (BBC Radio 4 Woman's Hour Drama, 2002)
 Who Goes There? (BBC Radio 4, 2002)
 I Have No Mouth, and I Must Scream (BBC Radio 4, 2002)
 The Old Curiosity Shop (BBC Radio 4 Woman's Hour Drama, 2002)
 A Day in the Life of Ivan Denisovich (BBC Radio 4 Classic Serial, 2003)
 The Woman in Black (BBC Radio 4 Saturday Play, 2004)
 The IPCRESS File (BBC Radio 4 Saturday Play, 2004)
 David Copperfield (BBC Radio 4 Woman's Hour Drama, 2005)
 Dombey and Son (BBC Radio 4 Woman's Hour Drama, 2007)
 The Veldt (BBC Radio 4 Afternoon Play, 2007)
 On The Beach (BBC Radio 4 Classic Serial, 2008)
 Rendezvous with Rama (BBC Radio 4 Classic Serial, 2009)
 The Gun (BBC Radio 4 Afternoon Play, 2011)
 Our Mutual Friend, (BBC Radio 4 Woman's Hour Drama, 2010)
 A Tale of Two Cities (BBC Radio 4 Afternoon Play, 2011)
 The Man Who Would Be King (BBC Radio 4, 2018)
 The Mystery of Edwin Drood (BBC Radio 4, 2020)

Notes:

References

External links 
  at David Higham Associates
 Mike Walker's radio play listing at Diversity Website
 Mike Walker's radio play listing at RadioListings website
 BBC writer's page

British dramatists and playwrights
Living people
British male dramatists and playwrights
Year of birth missing (living people)